Hermann Reichert (born 7 April 1944) is an Austrian philologist at the University of Vienna who specializes in Germanic studies.

Biography
Hermann Reichert was born in Pernitz, Austria, on 7 April 1944. He received his PhD in Germanic philology at the University of Vienna in 1971. His dissertation was supervised by Otto Höfler. He completed his habilitation in Old German and Nordic philology at the University of Vienna in 1984 under the supervision of Helmut Birkhan. Until his retirement in 2009, Reichert was associate professor at the Institute for German Studies at the University of Vienna, where he continues to teach and research.

Research
Reicherts research focuses on Middle High German and Old Norse literature, Germanic names, runology and early Germanic culture. He is a known authority on the Nibelungenlied. His 1984 habilitation,  is considered the standard reference work on Germanic names. Reichert wrote many articles for the second edition of the Reallexikon der Germanischen Altertumskunde, of which he was co-editor.

Selected works
 Wiedergabe der wulfilanischen Medien und Tenuen im späten Ostgermanischen, 1971
 Nibelungenlied und Nibelungensage, 1985
 Lexikon der Altgermanischen Personennamen, 1987
 Walther von der Vogelweide für Anfänger, 2009 
 Heldensage und Rekonstruktion: Untersuchungen zur Thidrekssaga, 1992
 Das Nibelungenlied. Nach der St. Galler Handschrift, 2005
 Konkordanz zum Nibelungenlied nach der St. Galler Handschrift, 2006
 Wolfram von Eschenbach, Parzival für Anfänger, 2017
 Wolfram von Eschenbach, Parzival. Band 1: Text, 2019
 Wolfram von Eschenbach, Parzival. Band 2: Untersuchungen, 2019
 Nibelungenlied-Lehrwerk, 2019
 Minne. Eine Vorlesung, 2020

See also

 Rudolf Much
 Otto Gschwantler
 Rudolf Simek
 Heinrich Beck (philologist)
 Dennis Howard Green
 Leslie Peter Johnson
 Brian O. Murdoch

Sources

External links
 Hermann Reichert at the website of the University of Vienna

1944 births
Austrian editors
Austrian non-fiction writers
Austrian philologists
Germanists
Germanic studies scholars
Linguists of Germanic languages
Living people
Old Norse studies scholars
People from Wiener Neustadt-Land District
University of Vienna alumni
Academic staff of the University of Vienna